Patrick Seagrist (born February 21, 1998) is an American professional soccer player who plays as a defender for Colorado Springs Switchbacks of the USL Championship.

Early life and career
Seagrist attended Marquette University where he played for the soccer team for four years tallying 6 goals and 16 assists in 65 appearances.

In 2019, Seagrist made eight appearances for USL League Two club, Chicago FC United.

Professional career

New York Red Bulls
Seagrist was select 10th overall in the 2020 MLS SuperDraft by the New York Red Bulls. On February 27, Seagrist signed his first professional contract with the first team.

Seagrist's option was declined by New York on November 30, 2020.

Inter Miami
On December 23, 2020, Seagrist joined Inter Miami ahead of their 2021 season. New York acquired a third-round 2021 MLS SuperDraft pick in exchange.

On April 15, 2021, it was announced that Seagrist would join USL Championship side Indy Eleven on a season-long loan.

Following the 2021 season, Seagrist's contract option was declined by Miami.

Memphis 901 FC
Seagrist signed with Memphis 901 in the USL Championship on January 20, 2022.

Colorado Springs Switchbacks
On November 21, 2022, it was announced that Seagrist would move to USL Championship side Colorado Springs Switchbacks at the beginning of the 2023 season.

Career statistics

References

External links 
 Patrick Seagrist - Men's Soccer Marquette bio
 

1998 births
Living people
American soccer players
Association football defenders
Chicago FC United players
Colorado Springs Switchbacks FC players
Indy Eleven players
Inter Miami CF players
Major League Soccer players
Marquette Golden Eagles men's soccer players
Memphis 901 FC players
New York Red Bulls draft picks
New York Red Bulls players
People from Barrington, Illinois
Soccer players from Illinois
USL Championship players
USL League Two players